Roger Adams (1889–1971) was an American organic chemist.

Roger Adams may also refer to:
Roger Adams (printer) (c. 1681–1741), printer and bookseller
Roger Adams (MP) (died 1405), Member of Parliament (MP) for Great Yarmouth
Roger Adams (Canadian football) in 1977 CFL Draft
Roger Adams, who created and patented Heelys
Roger Adams (chemist) (1889-?) president of American Chemical Society

See also
Adams (surname)
Roger Adam, French aircraft designer